The 1957 FA Cup final was a football match played on 4 May 1957 at Wembley Stadium between Aston Villa and Manchester United. Villa won 2–1, with both of their goals scored by Peter McParland. Tommy Taylor scored United's goal. It was Villa's first major trophy for 37 years.

The final was marred by a collision after only six minutes between Villa forward Peter McParland and United goalkeeper Ray Wood, which left Wood unconscious with a broken cheekbone. Wood left the pitch and Jackie Blanchflower took over in goal for United. Wood eventually rejoined the game in an outfield position as a virtual passenger before returning to goal for the last seven minutes of the game.

Villa's victory gave them their seventh FA Cup title, a record at the time, but since passed by three clubs including Manchester United, who have twelve wins. They reached the final in 2000, when they lost to Chelsea, and in 2015, when they lost to Arsenal.

Six of the 11 players who took to the field for United in this game died in the Munich air disaster nine months later; as did a further two players who did not appear in the game, while two others (who both appeared in the game) were injured to such an extent that they never played again. The only United players who appeared in the final a year later were full-back Bill Foulkes and forward Bobby Charlton. The death of Foulkes in November 2013 leaves Charlton as the last surviving player from the United team in the 1957 FA Cup Final, while the death of Nigel Sims in January 2018 left Peter McParland as the only remaining survivor from the winning team.

In December 2007, BBC Four's Timeshift series screened a documentary, A Game of Two Eras, which compared the 1957 final with its 2007 counterpart.

Road to Wembley

Aston Villa

Manchester United

Match details

References and links

External links
Line-ups and scorers

FA Cup Finals
Fa Cup Final
Fa Cup Final 1957
Fa Cup Final 1957
FA Cup Final
FA Cup Final